Francesco Fontana (Naples – July 1656, Naples) was an Italian lawyer and an astronomer.

Biography
Francesco Fontana studied law at the University of Naples and then he became a lawyer in the court at the Castel Capuano. But failing to always find truth in the Court, he began to study mathematics and astronomy.
He created woodcuts [please add reference as there is no evidence that Fontana was an engraver] showing the Moon and the planets as he saw them through a self-constructed telescope. 
Fontana traced, in 1636, the first drawing of Mars and discovered its rotation.
In February 1646 he published the book Novae coelestium terrestriumq[ue] rerum observationes, et fortasse hactenus non-vulgatae, where he presented all the observations of the Moon made from 1629 until 1645, the drawings of the bands seen on Jupiter's disc, the strange appearances of Saturn, as well as of the stars of the Milky Way.
With a Fontana's telescope, the Jesuit Giovanni Battista Zupi observed for the first time in 1630 the horizontal bands on the atmosphere of Jupiter and in 1639 the phases of Mercury, an evidence, together with the phases of Venus observed by Galileo in 1610, that the Copernicus's heliocentric theory was correct.

In 1645, he claimed to have observed a satellite of Venus (Paul Stroobant demonstrated in 1887 that all similar observations were not related to a putative satellite of Venus).

He died of plague in Naples with the whole family in July 1656.

The lunar crater Fontana and the crater Fontana on Mars are named in his honor.

Microscope

Fontana also claimed to have invented the compound microscope (two or more lenses in a tube) in 1618, an invention that has many claimants including Cornelis Drebbel, Zacharias Jansen or his father Hans Martens, and Galileo Galilei.

References

 Francesco Stelluti, Persio tradotto..., Roma 1630, p. 47;
 Athanasius Kircher, Ars Magna Lucis et Umbrae, Romae 1646, pp. 16, 831;
 Giovanni Battista Riccioli, Almagestum novum, Bononiae 1651, pp. 203, 208, 485 ss.;
 Lorenzo Crasso, Elogii de gli huomini letterati, II, Venezia 1666, pp. 296–300;
 Christiaan Huygens, Oeuvres complétes, I, La Haye 1888, ad Indicem;
 Edizione nazionale delle opere di Galileo Galilei, XVII, pp. 192, 308, 363, 375, 383 s.; XVIII, pp. 18, 85; XX, p. 442;
 Il carteggio linceo della vecchia Accademia di Federico Cesi, a cura di Giuseppe Gabrieli, in Memorie della Reale Accademia nazionale dei Lincei, classe di scienze morali storiche e filologiche, s. 6, VII (1942), pp. 1008, 1124, 1127, 1131, 1144 s., 1205;
 Le opere dei discepoli di Galileo Galilei. Carteggio 1642–48, a cura di Paolo Galluzzi, Maurizio Torrini, I, Firenze 1975, ad Indicem;
 Marin Mersenne, Correspondance, XV, Paris 1983, ad Indicem;
 Matteo Barbieri, Notizie istoriche dei mattematici e filosofi del Regno di Napoli, Napoli 1778, pp. 134–138;
 Pietro Napoli Signorelli, Vicende della coltura nelle due Sicilie, V, Napoli 1786, pp. 222–225;
 Luigi Maria Rezzi, Sull'invenzione del microscopio, in Atti dell'Accademia Pontificia de' nuovi Lincei, V (1852), pp. 108 ss.;
 Antonio Favaro, Galileo e il telescopio di Francesco Fontana, in Atti e memorie dell'Accademia di scienze lettere ed arti in Padova, n.s., XIX (1903), pp. 61–71;
 Gino Arrighi, Gli "occhiali" di Francesco Fontana in un carteggio inedito di A. Santini, in Physis, VI (1964), pp. 432–448;
 Giovanna Baroncelli, L'astronomia a Napoli al tempo di Galileo, in Galileo e Napoli, a cura di Fabrizio Lomonaco, Maurizio Torrini, Napoli 1987, pp. 197–225.

External links 

 Novae coelestium ... observationes (1646, Latin)
 

1580s births
1656 deaths
17th-century Italian astronomers
Italian engravers
Scientists from Naples